The deputy governor of the Reserve Bank of India is the second most senior executive of the Reserve Bank of India after its governor. Since its establishment in 1934 by the government of India, the RBI has had 63 deputy governors.

The term of office typically runs for three years and can, in some cases, be extended for another two years. 

The inaugural officeholder was James Braid Taylor, while K J Udeshi holds the unique distinction of becoming the first female deputy governor of the Reserve Bank of India.

Currently there are four incumbent deputy governors of the Reserve Bank of India

RBI deputy governors list

References

External links
 
 
 

Reserve Bank of India
Lists of office-holders in India
Lists of chairmen
Chairpersons of corporations by company